Davis Langdon was a construction consultancy company originally founded in London in 1919, which grew to approximately 2,500 employees working in over 18 countries worldwide. In October 2010, the company was acquired by AECOM, with its operations outside Australasia and Asia rebranded as AECOM in 2013.

Early history
Horace William Langdon established a quantity surveying practice in Holborn, London in 1919, and worked for a time in partnership (dissolved 1927) with a John Belmont Taylor. In 1921 Cecil Tom Every joined Langdon's practice, and they formed Langdon & Every in 1928, which expanded to operate in the Middle East, Australasia and Asia Pacific regions as well as in the UK. (Langdon was a local councillor and served as mayor of the Metropolitan Borough of Holborn (1935–1936); Every was Director of Post-War Building Programmes at the Ministry of Works, recognised with a CBE in the 1946 New Year Honours.)

In 1931, another quantity surveying practice was established by Owen Davis. Cambridge graduate and QS John Belfield joined Davis establishing a partnership, Davis & Belfield, in 1935. In 1944, they formed a new partnership with Bobbie Everest (a descendant of George Everest), becoming Davis, Belfield & Everest.

Langdon & Every merged with Davis Belfield & Everest in 1988 to become Davis Langdon & Everest, and in 2004 Davis Langdon & Everest converted to a Limited Liability Partnership to become Davis Langdon LLP.

AECOM era
In October 2010, the company became part of AECOM Technology Corporate – a global provider of professional technical and management support services. From that date Davis Langdon became known globally as AECOM's Program, Cost, Consultancy team, whilst presenting its services to the market as Davis Langdon, An AECOM Company.

On 1 October 2013, it rebranded as AECOM in Europe, the Middle East, Africa and the Americas. In Australia and New Zealand however, the company continues to be known as Davis Langdon, An AECOM Company. Furthermore, in Asia, it is known as Davis Langdon KPK, An AECOM Company, which incorporates the name of KPK – an Asia-based company specialising in construction estimation and contract management consultancy that was acquired by AECOM in 2012.

Services
The specific services offered globally by the company include cost consultancy, project management, CDM coordinator and health and safety services, management consulting, legal support, specification consulting, engineering services, fiscal incentives advice and facilities management. The company provides these services for clients investing in infrastructure, property and construction and has worked on a number of high-profile projects including the Olympic Park for the 2012 Summer Olympics in London; Tate Modern and the Eden Project in the United Kingdom; Estádio do Dragão in Portugal; Abu Dhabi International Airport; Grand Egyptian Museum in Cairo, Egypt; The Gateway Bridge Upgrade in Brisbane, Australia; the San Francisco Transbay Terminal, U.S.; the Gautrain Rapid Rail Link in Johannesburg, and Green Point, Cape Town – built for the 2010 FIFA World Cup – in Cape Town, South Africa.

List of notable projects
Projects worked on by Davis Langdon, An AECOM Company include:
 Adelaide Botanic Garden, Australia
 Alexandria Library, Egypt
 Anchorage Museum at Rasmuson Center, Anchorage, Alaska
 Baha Mar Resort, Bahamas
 Beirut Central District, Lebanon
 Birmingham Central Library, UK
 British Council, Egypt
 British Embassy, Bahrain
 British Empire and Commonwealth Museum "Abolition of Slavery Exhibition", Bristol, UK
 Central Bank of Kuwait
 Central Terminal Building, Johannesburg International Airport, South Africa
 Children's Hospital of Philadelphia
 Commercial Bank Tower, Doha, State of Qatar
 Commerzbank, Frankfurt
 Cooper Union for the Advancement of Science and Art, New York City
 Dubai Waterfront, UAE
 Dublin Airport – Terminal 2
 Eastside, Birmingham, UK
 Eden Project, Cornwall, UK 
 Elephant House, Copenhagen Zoo
 Gateway Bridge Upgrade, Brisbane, Australia
 Grand Egyptian Museum
 Jumeirah Beach Hotel, Dubai, UAE
 Legoland, Germany
 London 2012 Summer Olympics – Olympic Park, East London
 Mall of the Emirates, Dubai
 Mondavi Center for the Arts, University of California, Davis, California, USA
 National Waterfront Museum, Swansea, UK 
 Paradise project delivering Liverpool 1, Liverpool, UK
 Rennes Viaduct, France
 Royal Festival Hall, London, UK
 Shard London Bridge, London, UK
 Smithsonian Institution, Patent Office Building, Washington DC, USA
 Tate Modern, London, UK
 The Lakes Resort, Cairns, Australia
 The Liverpool Arena and Convention Centre at Kings Waterfront, Liverpool, UK
 Theatre Royal, Norwich, Norwich, UK
 V&A Waterfront Marina, Cape Town, South Africa
 Westfield Shopping Centre, West London

Further reading
 Meikle, Jim (2009). Thinking Big: The History of Davis Langdon, Black Dog Publishing.

References

External links
 Official site
 Parent site

Construction and civil engineering companies of the United Kingdom
Construction and civil engineering companies established in 1919
Companies based in the London Borough of Camden
Consulting firms established in 1919
1919 establishments in England
British companies established in 1919